Evansdale can mean:

 Evansdale, Edmonton, a neighbourhood in Edmonton, Alberta, Canada
 Evansdale, Iowa, United States
 Evansdale, New Zealand
 Evansdale Cheese, a cheese producer in New Zealand
 Evansdale statistical district, a census-gathering district covering a large area of rural East Otago, New Zealand